Kyje is a cadastral district of Prague, Czech Republic. In 2015 it had 9,036 inhabitants.

Geography
The Kyjský Pond is located in the area.

Sights
The main landmark is the Church of Saint Bartholomew. It was built in the Romanesque style, probably between 1226 and 1236.

Doubravka XIV is a modern observation tower built in 2017–2018.

Gallery

References

Districts of Prague